Leander Paes and Purav Raja were the defending champions but only Paes chose to defend his title, partnering Miguel Ángel Reyes-Varela. Paes lost in the quarterfinals to Alex Lawson and Jackson Withrow.

Toshihide Matsui and Frederik Nielsen won the title after defeating Hunter Reese and Tennys Sandgren 7–6(8–6), 7–5 in the final.

Seeds

Draw

References
 Main Draw
 Qualifying Draw

Knoxville Challenger - Doubles
2018 Doubles